The 5″/40 caliber gun (spoken "five-inch-forty-caliber") were used in the secondary batteries of the United States Navy's early battleships, armored cruisers, protected cruisers, unprotected cruisers, and auxiliary cruisers.

Design
The Mark 2, Nos. 3 – 70, was a 40 caliber naval gun that fired semi-fixed ammunition. The Mod 1 had different exterior dimensions for the hoops and chase and was primarily intended to be used with the Mark 2 Mods 1 and 4 mounts. It was intended for the Mark 2 Mods 1 and 4 and Mark 3 Mods 1 and 6 mounts. Mod 3 was the same as the Mod 2 but without the cylindrical section. It was designed to use the Mark 2 Mods 1, 2, 4, and 5 and the Mark 3 Mods 1, 4, 6, and 9 mounts. The Mod 4 only differed from the Mark 3 in that it had a muzzle bell. Mod 5, gun No. 39, was an experimental gun that hd  cut off of the muzzle, making it a 35-caliber gun. It also had a locking hoop that extended the whole length of the chase hoop to help balance the gun. The Mod 6 was a Mod 4 gun that had been modified for use in the 5-inch Mark 8 Mods 4, 13, and 14 mounts. The Mod 7 gun was a Mod 2, 3, or 4 that had a conical nickel-steel liner and a Mod 8 was a Mod 6 gun also with a conical nickel-steel liner. The first gun that was delivered in October 1890 was gun No. 5.

The Mark 3, gun Nos. 87–199, 287–292, were first delivered in January 1897. The Mark 3 was also a semi-fixed ammunition gun that was designed for use on cruisers and battleships. The Mark three was constructed of a tube, jacket and two hoops, all of gun steel with a side-swing carrier type breech. Mod 1 used a different jacket with a locking hoop forward of the slide cylinder. Mod 2 was a Mod 0 or Mod 1 gun relined using a conical nickel-steel liner. The muzzle end was cut off and a conical nickel-steel liner installed, this gave it the same characteristics as a 5″/25 caliber Mark 10 anti-aircraft gun. The gun later ruptured during testing. The muzzle of gun No. 174, mounted on the battleship , also had its muzzle blow off.

The Mark 4, guns No. 71–86, delivered in April 1896, were derived from the Mark 2 but  longer and consequent differences in slide surface and other externals. Mod 1 added a nickel-steel tube and hoops that the Mod 0 didn't have and the Mod 3 was the Mod 1 relined with a nickel-steel liner. With the Mod 4 an attempt was made to thread the gun to fit the Mark 2 Mod 4 mount but wasn't used. This gun was designed to arm small cruisers and many were used to arm auxiliaries during WW I.

Naval Service

Marks 2–4 were used on many auxiliaries during World War I.

Notes

References

Books
 
Online sources

External links

 Bluejackets Manual, 1917, 4th revision: US Navy 14-inch Mark 1 gun

 

Naval guns of the United States
127 mm artillery